Tante Cose da Veder (So Much to See) is a compilation album by Czech recording artists Michal Horáček, Petr Hapka and Ondřej Brzobohatý released on Sony Music in 2011.

Track listing 

Notes
 All songs performed in Czech.

Credits and personnel

 Michal Horáček - lyrics, lead vocal
 Petr Hapka - music, lead vocal
 Ondřej Brzobohatý - arrangement
 Karel Gott - lead vocal
 Jaromír Nohavica - lead vocal

 Katarína Knechtová - lead vocal
 Jiří Suchý - lead vocal
 Dan Bárta - lead vocal
 Szidi Tobias - lead vocal
 Aneta Langerová - lead vocal

Charts

Album

Airplay singles

References

External links 
 MichalHoracek.cz > Discography > Tante Cose da Veder

2011 compilation albums